Hyperstoma marginatum is a species of firefly beetle endemic to Sri Lanka.

Description
Average length is about 5.0 mm. The 1 to 2 antennomeres are yellow to light brown in color, and antennomeres 3 to 11 are dark brown in color. Penultimate abdominal tergum is straight basally which are furnished with two small rounded tubercles. Male genitalia possess a V-shaped phallobase with robust paramerae. Phallus broadly emarginate distally.

References 

Lampyridae
Insects of Sri Lanka
Insects described in 1979